Culture of corruption may refer to:
 Culture of Corruption: Obama and His Team of Tax Cheats, Crooks, and Cronies, a book by Michelle Malkin
 Culture of corruption, a political slogan used during the 2006 Republican party scandals